Lotto is a Polish alternative rock trio started in 2012 in Gdańsk by Mike Majkowski (bass violin), Łukasz Rychlicki (guitar), and Paweł Szpura (drums). Their first hit was Elite Feline.

They played e.g. with The Necks, at international festivals like Konfrontationen in Nickelsdorf, Jazz Jantar in Gdańsk, KRAAK Festival in Aalst, Belgium, Festival Densités in France or Enjoy Jazz in Heidelberg.

Discography
 "Ask the Dust" (2013)
 "Elite Feline" (2016)

References

External links
 Official Website
 Best of 2016. Poland

Musical groups established in 2012
Polish rock music groups
Polish musical groups
2012 establishments in Poland